Alexander Hamilton is a marble bust portrait of Alexander Hamilton, done in the style of a Roman Senator, by the Italian sculptor Giuseppe Ceracchi. Ceracchi also created many replicas, in both marble and plaster. The bust was later used as a model for sculptures and paintings.

History
Ceracchi created a terracotta model of Hamilton, from life, about 1791–92. This was subsequently sent to Rome, where he created the marble version. As written to Hamilton in July 1792, Ceracchi was "impatient to receive the clay that I had the satisfaction of forming from your witty and significant physiognomy". He returned to deliver the bust to Hamilton in 1794. He did not receive payment until later. On March 3, 1796, Hamilton wrote in his cash-book: "for this sum through delicacy paid upon cherachi’s draft for making my bust on his own importunity & as a favour to him $620"

The Hamilton family kept the bust until 1896 when it was bequeathed to the New York Public Library along with the portrait painting of George Washington, The Constable-Hamilton Portrait, by Gilbert Stuart. Both were sold together, as requested by the will, on November 30, 2005 to the Crystal Bridges Museum of American Art for over $8 million.

One of the original copies of the bust is now housed at Hamilton Grange National Memorial, in New York City. The original is displayed at the Crystal Bridges Museum of American Art in Bentonville, Arkansas.

Description
Ceracchi portrayed Hamilton in the style of a Roman Senator, with wavy hair and bare-chested, wearing a ribbon of the Order of the Cincinnati over his right shoulder.

Inscription
The original work is inscribed on the back in Latin:

This translates to "Executed in Philadelphia and copied in Florence, Executed by Joseph Ceracchi, 1794."

Legacy
The painter John Trumbull used the bust as model for a series of 1804–1808 portraits of Hamilton.

The first U.S. Postal Service stamp to honor Hamilton was an 1870 30-cent stamp using this bust as a model.

In 1880, the bust owned by Hamilton's son, John C. Hamilton, was used as a model for the head of the granite statue by Carl Conrads.

At the Hamilton Grange National Memorial, the National Park Service has installed a touch-screen display that features an avatar modeled after Ceracchi's bust.

While Ceracchi (born on July 4, 1751) created busts for several founding fathers, his life did not end well. After returning to Europe, he first celebrated Napoleon with a bust, but then turned against him. After an unsuccessful plot, Napoleon had him guillotined at the Place de Grève on January 30, 1801.

Gallery

References

External links

1794 sculptures
Hamilton
Ceracchi
Hamilton
Collection of the Crystal Bridges Museum of American Art